The Dannie Heineman Prize of the Göttingen Academy of Sciences and Humanities has been awarded biennially since 1961 for excellent recently published publications in a new research field of current interest. It is awarded to younger researchers in natural sciences or mathematics. The prize is named after Dannie Heineman, a Belgian-US philanthropist, engineer and businessman with German roots.

Prizewinners 

 1961 James Franck, biochemistry
 1963 Edmund Hlawka, mathematics
 1965 Georg Wittig, chemistry
 1967 Martin Schwarzschild, astrophysics
 1967 Gobind Khorana, biochemistry
 1969 Brian Pippard, physics
 1971 Neil Bartlett, chemistry
 1973 Igor Schafarewitsch, mathematics
 1975 Philip Warren Anderson, physics
 1977 Albert Eschenmoser, chemistry
 1979 Phillip Griffiths, mathematics
 1981 Jacques Friedel, physics
 1983 Gerd Faltings, mathematics
 1986 Rudolf Thauer jr, biology
 1987 Alex Müller and Georg Bednorz, physics
 1989 Dieter Oesterhelt, biochemistry
 1991 Jean-Pierre Demailly, mathematics
 1993 Richard N. Zare, chemistry
 1995 Donald M. Eigler, physics
 1997 Regine Kahmann, biology
 1999 Wolfgang Ketterle, physics
 2001 Christopher C. Cummins, chemistry
 2003 Michael Neuberger, biology
 2005 Richard Taylor, mathematics
 2007 Bertrand I. Halperin, physics
 2009 Gerald F. Joyce, biology
 2012 Krzysztof Matyjaszewski, chemistry
 2013 Emmanuel Jean Candès, mathematics
 2015 Andrea Cavalleri, physics
 2018 , chemistry
 2019 Oscar Randal-Williams, mathematics
 2021 Viola Priesemann, physics

See also 

 List of general science and technology awards

References

External links 
 Dannie Heineman Preis

Awards established in 1961
Science and technology awards